Private Islands is an Emmy Award winning American travel television series. Host Amber Wyatt goes on adventures around the world, exploring not only private islands, but luxurious resorts, and the expansive cultures in each location. The show is a product of AWE (A Wealth of Entertainment) network.

Hosts
Amber Wyatt is the fifth host of Private Islands. Christina Cindrich is the show's original host. Since then, each host has hosted one season each. Wyatt is currently working on her second season with the show.

Awards
On July 17, 2015, Private Islands won an Emmy Award for the episode "The Magic of Venice Carnevale." Christina Cindrich was the producer and host at the time. The award was for "Arts/Entertainment Program/Special".

Episodes

Season One (2010–2013)
 Islands of the Bahamas – October 26, 2010
 Musha Cay and the Islands of Copperfield Bay – June 29, 2011
 Desroches – August 7, 2011
 Emerald Cay – March 24, 2012
 Turks and Caicos – April 1, 2012
 French Polynesia – October 21, 2012
 Peter Island – December 16, 2012
 Roatan – December 16, 2012
 Florida Keys – January 26, 2013
 Belize – March 9, 2013
 Calivigny Island – May 4, 2013

Season Two (2013–2015)
 Little Bokeelia – June 1, 2013
 Fiji: Paradise in the Pacific – July 7, 2013
 Fiji: Exotic Escape – August 31, 2013
 Jumby Bay – September 28, 2013
 Four Seasons Maldives – November 23, 2013
 Christina's Top 10 – December 14, 2013
 Phuket, Thailand – February 22, 2014
 Isla Simca – April 12, 2014
 The Grenadines – July 26, 2014
 Laucala – September 20, 2014
 Bora Bora – December 28, 2014
 Zambia – April 4, 2015

Season Three (2015–2016)
 Philippines – July 23, 2015
 Palau – September 12, 2015
 Scrub Island – December 6, 2015
 Laamu – January 1, 2016
 St. Lucia – March 5, 2016

Season Four (2018–2021)
 Lizard Island – April 7, 2018
 Coco Plum Island Resort, Belize – May 6, 2018
 Zaya Nurai – July 4, 2018
 Fowl Cay – July 4, 2018
 Dubai – August 24, 2018
 Hawaii – August 26, 2018
 Calala Island – November 11, 2018
 Wakaya Island – November 11, 2018
 Hamilton Island – November 11, 2018
 Sumba – November 11, 2018
 Pulau Joyo – December 25, 2018
 Sandals Cay – January 1, 2019
 Best of Paradise – January 1, 2019
 Parrot Cay – January 1, 2019
 Six Senses Zil Pasyon – February 23, 2019
 Thorntree Lodge – March 23, 2019
 Six Senses Laamu – May 13, 2019
 Royal Chundu – July 17, 2019
 Soneva Fushi – September 1, 2019
 Soneva Jani – September 1, 2019
 Maalifushi – November 16, 2019
 Bedarra Island – December 22, 2020
 Make Peace Island – December 23, 2020
 Orpheus Island – April 25, 2021

References

External links

 
 
 

2010 American television series debuts
2021 American television series endings
2010s American reality television series